Tower of death may refer to: 

 Kalyan minaret, also known as the Tower of Death.
 Game of Death II, a 1981 martial arts film also known as Tower of Death